Swapnil Raj Dhaka (born 16 April 1996) is an Indian professional footballer who plays as a forward for Chennai City in the I-League. He has formerly played for FK Sinđelić Beograd in the Serbian League Belgrade of Serbia.

Career
Born in Jaipur, Rajasthan, Dhaka began his career with Jaipur Football Club.

FK Sinđelić Beograd  
He soon moved to Serbia and joined Serbian First League side Sinđelić Beograd.
He made his competitive debut for the club on 26 September 2018 in a Serbian Cup match against Voždovac. He played 58 minutes as Sinđelić Beograd won 1–0. Dhaka then made his debut in the league on 5 November 2018 against Žarkovo. He started and played the whole match as Sinđelić lost 2–1.

Chennai City
After a short stint with Beograd, Dhaka came back to India and signed with I-League side Chennai City FC in 2019.

Career statistics

See also
 List of Indian football players in foreign leagues

References

External links 
Swapnil Raj Dhaka at the-aiff.com
 Serbian First Division Profile

1996 births
Living people
Indian footballers
FK Sinđelić Beograd players
Serbian First League players
Association football forwards
Sportspeople from Jaipur
Footballers from Rajasthan
Indian expatriate footballers
Expatriate footballers in Serbia
Sudeva Delhi FC players
Chennai City FC players
I-League players